Yennamo Yedho is a 2014 Indian Tamil language romantic comedy film directed by Ravi Thyagarajan starring Gautham Karthik, Rakul Preet Singh, and Nikesha Patel. A remake of the Telugu film Ala Modalaindi, the film was produced by Ravi Prasad Productions and has music by D. Imman. Gopi Jagadeeswaran was the cinematographer and Lalgudi N Illayaraja, of Vishwaroopam fame, was the art director. The film released on 25 April 2014 to mixed reviews. The film's title was based on the song of the same name from Ko.

In 2019, the film was dubbed in Hindi as Ajab Ashique Ki Gazab Kahani.

Cast

 Gautham Karthik as Gautham
 Prabhu as Chakravarthi
 Rakul Preet Singh as Nithya
 Nikesha Patel as Kavya
 Amit Bhargav as Anand
 Anupama Kumar as Lakshmi, Gautham's mother
 Azhagam Perumal as Narayanan, Nithya's father
 Surekha Vani as Nithya's mother
 Sai Prashanth as Gautham's brother-in-law
 Madhan Bob as Madhan, Nithya's uncle
 Shakeela as Kujli Plus TV Anchor
 Manobala as Guruji
 Lollu Sabha Manohar
 Yogi Babu as Goon
 Thagubothu Ramesh as Gautham
 Snigdha as Gautham's sister
 Sadhana as Anuradha
 Ravi Raj as Dr. Ravishankar
 Satheesh Natrajan

Production
Ravi Prasad Outdoor Unit, pioneers in the south for film shooting equipment bought the remake rights of Ala Modalaindi and ventured into film production with this film under the banner of Raviprasad Productions. Ravi Thyagarajan, son of fight master Thyagarajan and a former assistant to the director Priyadarshan, was selected to direct the film and make his directorial debut.

The shooting began on 23 May 2013. The second schedule began on 27 June 2013 in Hyderabad.

Soundtrack
The music was composed by D. Imman.

Release
The satellite rights of the film were sold to Jaya TV.

Critical reception
The film received negative reviews from critics. The Times of India gave the film 2 stars out of 5 and wrote, "It is a convoluted plot that just feels inane on paper but one that could pass off as a comedy of the absurd on screen. But, because of its uneven tone, the film comes across as something that is severely disjointed and unfocussed. The Hindu wrote, "there’s no end to the tiresome sequence of romance and break-ups in Yennamo Yedho. It has everything going wrong for it. A convoluted plot, unimpresive performances and unfunny comedy". Sify wrote "the plot is hackneyed, romance is half baked and lead pair is unimpressive", calling the film "a pale version of the original" and describing it as "heartbreakingly disappointing". Deccan Chronicle wrote, "Despite being the remake of Ala Modalaindi, which was a hit in Telugu, Yennamo Yedho fails to impress". Behindwoods.com gave 1.75 stars out of 5 and wrote, "Yennamo Yedho has very few gripping scenes and doesn’t make the connect with the viewer. Its pace is laborious and the romance that is portrayed is nothing new to the viewer. The so-called twists are also predictable and artificial. In spite of the refreshing lead pair, the movie leaves you weary".

The New Indian Express wrote, "The film may not be the best of romantic comedies. But it’s a fairly enjoyable watch". Indiaglitz stated, "A little bit of action, a lot of comedy - mostly situational and full of romance, Yennamo Yedho is a fairly clean entertainer and a lighthearted movie experience to chill out on, with friends and family". Oneindia.in called it "an enjoyable movie".

References

External links
 

2014 films
2010s Tamil-language films
2014 romantic comedy films
Indian romantic comedy films
Tamil remakes of Telugu films
2014 directorial debut films